The Annual Review of Organizational Psychology and Organizational Behavior is a peer-reviewed scientific journal published by Annual Reviews. It releases an annual volume of review articles relevant to the fields of industrial and organizational psychology, organizational behavior, and human resource management. It has been in publication since 2014, under founding editor Frederick P. Morgeson. As of 2022, Journal Citation Reports gives the journal a 2021 impact factor of 12.553, ranking it sixth of 226 journal titles in the category "Management" and second of 83 titles in "Psychology, Applied".

History
The Annual Review of Organizational Psychology and Organizational Behavior was first published in 2014 with Frederick P. Morgeson as the founding editor. Previously, review articles about industrial and organizational psychology, organizational behavior, and human resource management appeared infrequently in the Annual Review of Psychology. Due to the large number of sub-disciplines that fall under the umbrella of psychology, the Annual Reviews board of directors decided that it would be beneficial to create a new psychology journal that focused on these areas. Though it was initially published in print, as of 2021 it is only published electronically.

Statistics and indexing
As of 2022, Journal Citation Reports gives the journal a 2021 impact factor of 12.553, ranking it sixth of 226 journal titles in the category "Management" and second of 83 titles in "Psychology, Applied". It is abstracted and indexed in Scopus, Social Sciences Citation Index, and PsycINFO.

References 

 

Organization Psychology and Organizational Behavior
Annual journals
Publications established in 2014
English-language journals
Organizational psychology journals
Human resource management journals